Rynagh O'Grady (18 April 1951 – 7 February 2021) was an Irish actress who was known for her roles of Mary O'Leary in the Channel 4 sitcom Father Ted and Minnie Kennedy in the 1999 film A Love Divided. She trained in the Abbey Theatre School and first appeared on their stage in 1969.

In Father Ted, she  starred alongside Patrick Drury as a husband and wife couple, John and Mary, who constantly argue and fight, but act happily married when talking to the priests.

O'Grady died on 7 February 2021, aged 69. She was survived by her husband, Eamon Murray, as well as her four siblings and extended family.

Partial filmography

 Play for Today (1973, TV Series) - Gráinne
 Within These Walls (1975, TV Series) - Cathy Rooney
 Let's Get Those English Girls (1976) - Doreen
 The Glittering Prizes (1976) - Christine
 Yanks Go Home (1977, TV Series) - Miss Franklin
 The Stud (1978) - Meter Maid (uncredited)
 S.O.S. Titanic (1979, TV Movie) - Mary Agatha Glynn
 Can We Get On Now, Please? (1980, TV Series)
 Number 10 (1983, TV Mini-Series) - Mary Coghlan
 Ascendancy (1983) - Rose
 The Lilac Bus (1990, TV Movie) - Nancy
 The Commitments (1991) - Bernie's Mother
 Far and Away (1992) - Olive
 The Bill (1993, TV Series) - Mrs. Connor
 The Snapper (1993, TV Series) - Neighbour 1
 Don't Leave Me This Way (1993, TV Movie) - Viv Hicks
 The Bullion Boys (1993, TV Series) - Mrs. O'Brian
 The Rector's Wife (1994, TV Mini-Series) - Ella Pringle
 Widows' Peak (1994) - Maddie O'Hara, Broome's Maid
 Father Ted (1995-1998, TV Series) - Mary O'Leary
 Moll Flanders (1996) - Kindly Sister
 Night Train (1998) - Winnie
 A Love Divided (1999) - Minnie Kennedy
 When Brendan met Trudy (2000) - Lynn
 The Cassidys (2001, TV Series) - Jane Traynor
 Ultimate Force (2002, TV Series) - Mary
 Breakfast on Pluto (2005) - Mrs. Coyle
 Dorothy Mills (2008) - Mrs. Mc Cllellan
 Supervized (2019) - Dolores

References

External links
 Official website
 
 

1951 births
2021 deaths
Irish film actresses
Irish television actresses
Actresses from Dublin (city)
Father Ted
Abbey Theatre